Leander H. Shepard (October 25, 1825July 31, 1893) was an American farmer and farm machinery salesman.  He served one term in the Wisconsin State Assembly, representing Dodge County.

Biography
Shepard was born on October 25, 1825, in Erie County, New York, the son of Amos Shepard (1775–1851) and Chloe Ann Shepard (1789–1863). He later resided in Burnett, Wisconsin, where he was a farmer. Additionally, he sold machinery for the McCormick Harvesting Machine Company. On December 4, 1856, Shepard married Cordelia Mattoon. They had four children. He died on July 31, 1893.

Political career
Shepard was a member of the Assembly during the 1877 session. He was a Republican.

References

External links

People from Erie County, New York
People from Burnett, Wisconsin
Republican Party members of the Wisconsin State Assembly
Farmers from Wisconsin
American salespeople
1825 births
1893 deaths
Burials in Wisconsin
19th-century American politicians